Zidyan-Kazmalyar (Zidyan-Qazmalar) is a rural locality (a selo) and the administrative centre of Zidyan-Kazmalyarsky Selsoviet, Derbentsky District, Republic of Dagestan, Russia. The population was 978 as of 2010. There are 10 streets.

Geography 
Zidyan-Kazmalyar is located 15 km northwest of Derbent (the district's administrative centre) by road. Bilgadi and Chinar are the nearest rural localities.

Nationalities 
Azerbaijanis live there.

References 

Rural localities in Derbentsky District